The 134th Cavalry Regiment (formerly the 134th Infantry Regiment) is a cavalry regiment in the Nebraska Army National Guard. By extension, it is a member of the United States Army National Guard, and as a currently federally-recognized unit, also a member of the National Guard of the United States.

History

Interwar period

The 134th Infantry Regiment returned to the United States aboard the USS General G. W. Goethals, arriving at the port of New York on 24 January 1919. The regiment proceeded to Camp Grant, Illinois, where it was mustered out of federal service, demobilized, and personnel discharged on 18 February 1919. Like many other states, Nebraska did not immediately reorganize its National Guard after World War I, instead choosing to wait for the War Department to present it an allotment of troops authorized per the amendments to the National Defense Act of 1916. This proved problematic. The Omaha race riot of 1919 forced the state to call upon federal troops at Fort Crook and Fort Omaha, and when a response was not received in a timely manner, the remaining Home Guard troops nearest the riot and a volunteer force of 300 World War I veterans were mobilized. The riot concluded by the time these troops were ready to move.

In late July 1920, after receiving its initial allotment which included one regiment of infantry, provisional companies were gradually organized and federally recognized in towns across the state. This task was completed by the spring of 1921, and the companies themselves were then reorganized to fit the new Militia Bureau tables of organization prescribed for an infantry regiment. As the majority of the units that made up an infantry regiment were organized and federally recognized, Nebraska could then establish battalion and regimental headquarters and headquarters companies. On 1 July 1921, the provisional companies of the Nebraska National Guard were reorganized as the 1st Infantry Regiment, Nebraska National Guard, and the regimental and battalion headquarters and headquarters companies were organized and federally recognized in early July 1921.

The 134th Infantry Regiment was reconstituted in the National Guard in 1921 and assigned to the state of Nebraska. It was concurrently relieved from the 34th Division and assigned to the 35th Division. A provision of the 1920 amendments to the National Defense Act of 1916 allowed for units of the National Guard and Organized Reserve that had served in World War I to retain their "names, numbers and other designations, flags, and records." On 25 October 1921, the 134th Infantry Regiment was reorganized by a redesignation of the 1st Infantry Regiment, Nebraska National Guard.

21st century 
Troop B, 1st Squadron, 134th Cavalry relocated from the closed Fremont Armory to the new Titan Readiness Center near Mead in 2014. On 1 September 2017, the squadron became the cavalry squadron of the 39th Infantry Brigade Combat Team of the Arkansas Army National Guard as the 67th Battlefield Surveillance Brigade converted to a maneuver enhancement brigade. Company D, 39th Brigade Support Battalion at Lincoln was activated in 2016 as the squadron forward support company under the same reorganization.

134th Infantry Regiment (Airborne)

The 2nd Battalion, 134th Infantry Regiment (Airborne) was activated in the Nebraska National Guard in November 2019, but under United States Army Center of Military History regulations, is a new unit and does not perpetuate the lineage of the previous iteration of the 134th Infantry Regiment, only sharing its name.

Lineage

 Organized in 1855 in the Nebraska Militia from existing units as the 1st and 2d Regiments
 Reorganized in part as the 1st Regiment, Nebraska Volunteer Infantry, and mustered into Federal service 11 June-21 July 1861 at Omaha
 Converted and redesignated 5 November 1863 as the 1st Nebraska Cavalry
 Consolidated 18 July 1865 with the 1st Battalion, Nebraska Veteran Cavalry (see Annex 1) and consolidated unit reorganized and redesignated as the 1st Nebraska Cavalry Veteran Volunteers
 Mustered out of Federal service 1 July 1866 at Omaha
 Reorganized 1867–1875 in the Nebraska State Militia as independent companies
 Companies consolidated to form the 1st Regiment of Mounted Infantry (organized 1875–1876) and the 2d Regiment of Infantry (organized 1878–1879)
 1st Regiment of Mounted Infantry and the 2d Regiment of Infantry consolidated 13 July 1881 to form the 1st Regiment
 Mustered into Federal service 9–10 May 1898 at Lincoln as the 1st Nebraska Volunteer Infantry; mustered out of Federal service 23 August 1899 at San Francisco, California
 Reorganized 11 June 1900 in the Nebraska National Guard as the 1st Infantry Regiment
 Consolidated 1 April 1913 with the 2d Infantry Regiment (see Annex 2) and reorganized as the 4th and 5th infantry Regiments
 4th and 5th Infantry Regiments mustered into Federal service 3 July 1916; mustered out of Federal service 21 February 1917
 Drafted into Federal service 5 August 1917
 4th Infantry Regiment converted and redesignated 1 October 1917 as the 127th Field Artillery and assigned to the 34th Division; demobilized 18 February 1919 at Camp Grant, Illinois
 5th Infantry Regiment reorganized and redesignated 1 October 1917 as the 134th Infantry and assigned to the 34th Division; demobilized 18 February 1919 at Camp Grant, Illinois
 Nebraska National Guard infantry regiment reorganized as provisional companies, 1920–1921
 Provisional companies reorganized and redesignated 1 July 1921 as the 1st Infantry Regiment; headquarters organized 7 July 1921 at Omaha
 Redesignated 25 October 1921 as the 134th Infantry and assigned to the 35th Division;
 Inducted into Federal service 23 December 1940 at home stations
 Inactivated 21 November 1945 at Camp Breckinridge, Kentucky
 Relieved 19 June 1946 from assignment to the 35th Infantry Division and assigned to the 34th Infantry Division
 Reorganized 17 October 1946 with headquarters at Omaha
 Reorganized 1 May 1959 as a parent regiment under the Combat Arms Regimental System to consist of the 1st and 2d Battle Groups, elements of the 34th Infantry Division
 Reorganized 1 April 1963 to consist of the 1st and 2d Battalions, elements of the 67th Infantry Brigade
 Reorganized 1 October 1985 to consist of the 1st and 2d Battalions, elements of the 35th Infantry Division
 Withdrawn 14 December 1987 from the Combat Arms Regimental System and reorganized under the United States Army Regimental System
 Reorganized 1 September 1996 to consist of the 1st Battalion, an element of the 35th Infantry Division
 Consolidated 1 September 2003 with the 167th Cavalry (see ANNEX 3), and consolidated unit designated as the 167th Cavalry, to consist of the 1st Squadron, an element of the 35th Infantry Division
 Reorganized and redesignated 1 September 2005 as the 134th Cavalry, to consist of the 1st Squadron, and relieved from assignment to the 35th Infantry Division
 Redesignated 1 October 2005 as the 134th Cavalry Regiment
 Ordered into active Federal service 11 October 2005 at home stations; released from active Federal service 29 September 2007 and reverted to state control
 Ordered into active Federal service 7 December 2010 at home stations; attached to 2d Brigade Combat Team, 34th Infantry Division; released from active Federal service 15 July 2011 and reverted to state control
 Reorganized 1 September 2017 as the 134th Cavalry (IBCT), to consist of the 1st Squadron, an element of the 39th Infantry Brigade Combat Team (IBCT) of the Arkansas Army National Guard

Annex 1

 Organized and mustered into Federal service 23 October 1862 – 24 March 1863 at Omaha as the 2d Nebraska Cavalry
 Mustered out of Federal service 4 September-23 December 1863 at Omaha
 Reorganized and mustered into Federal service 14 January 31 – August 1864 as the 1st Battalion, Nebraska Veteran Cavalry

Annex 2

 Organized 13 August 1887 in the Nebraska National Guard as the 2d Infantry Regiment
 Mustered into Federal service 9–14 May 1898 at Lincoln as the 2d Nebraska Volunteer Infantry; mustered out of Federal service 24 October 1898 at Omaha
 Reorganized 6 June 1899 in the Nebraska National Guard as the 2d Infantry Regiment

Annex 3

 Constituted 12 February 1964 in the Nebraska Army National Guard as the 167th Cavalry, a parent regiment under the Combat Arms Regimental System
 Reorganized 26 September 1985 to consist of the 1st Squadron, an element of the 35th Infantry Division
 Withdrawn 14 December 1987 from the Combat Arms Regimental System and reorganized under the United States Army Regimental System as the 167th Cavalry, to consist of the 1st Squadron
 Ordered into Federal service 30 December 2002 at home stations; released from active Federal service 31 October 2003 and reverted to state control

Source:

Distinctive unit insignia

Background
The distinctive unit insignia was originally approved for the 134th Infantry Regiment on 1 December 1932. On 22 August 2006, it was redesignated for the 134th Cavalry Regiment, with the description and symbolism updated.

Description
A Gold color metal and enamel device 1 1/8 inches (2.86 cm) in height overall consisting of a shield blazoned: Per chevron Azure and Argent, in chief the Katipunan sun in splendor and an olla Or charged with a bull skull Gules, in base a mound Vert a palm tree Proper entwined with a snake of the fifth.  Attached below a Gold scroll inscribed "LAH WE LAH HIS" in Blue letters.

Symbolism
The shield is Argent (white) and Azure (blue), the colors of the Infantry and the original designation of the unit. The Katipunan sun represents the Philippine Insurrection, and the palm tree Spanish–American War service. The olla is made gold to comply with heraldic rules, and denotes the World War I service of the organization in the 34th Division. The snake symbolizes Mexican Border service.

Coat of arms

Background
The coat of arms was originally approved for the 134th Infantry Regiment on 11 July 1938. On 22 August 2006, it was redesignated for the 134th Cavalry Regiment with the symbolism of the shield updated.

Blazon
 Shield: Per chevron Azure and Argent, in chief the Katipunan sun in splendor and an olla Or charged with a bull skull Gules, in base a mound Vert a palm tree Proper entwined with a snake of the fifth.
 Crest: That for the regiments and separate battalions of the Nebraska Army National Guard:  From a wreath Argent and Azure an ear of corn in full ear partially husked Proper.
 Motto: LAH WE LAH HIS (The Strong, The Brave).

Symbolism
 Shield: The shield is Argent (white) and Azure (blue), the colors of the Infantry and the original designation of the unit.  The Katipunan sun represents the Philippine Insurrection, and the palm tree Spanish–American War service.  The olla is made gold to comply with heraldic rules, and denotes the World War I service of the organization in the 34th Division.  The snake symbolizes the Mexican Border service.
 Crest: The crest is that of the Nebraska Army National Guard.

Campaign streamers

Decorations

Regiment
 Army Presidential Unit Citation with streamer embroidered BASTOGNE
 French Croix de Guerre 1939-1945 with Palm, streamer embroidered ST. LO
 Army Superior Unit Award with streamer embroidered BOSNIA 2003
 Army Meritorious Unit Commendation with streamer embroidered IRAQ 2006–2007
 Army Meritorious Unit Commendation with streamer embroidered AFGHANISTAN 2010–2011

Active subordinate units
 Headquarters Troop (Lincoln), 1st Squadron: Meritorious Unit Commendation with streamer embroidered EUROPEAN THEATER 1944–1945
 Troop A (Hastings), 1st Squadron
 Troop B (York), 1st Squadron
 Troop C (Beatrice), 1st Squadron: Presidential Unit Citation with streamer embroidered HABKIRCHEN

References

External links
 https://web.archive.org/web/20160304194352/http://www.nebraskastudies.org/0800/frameset_reset.html?http%3A%2F%2Fwww.nebraskastudies.org%2F0800%2Fstories%2F0801_0113.html%2A http://www.history.army.mil/html/forcestruc/lh.html 
 World War I Order of Battle 
 134th Infantry Regiment Website
 134th Infantry Regiment Combat History of WWII http://www.coulthart.com/134/combat_history_index.htm]

Cavalry regiments of the United States Army National Guard
Nebraska Army National Guard
Cavalry regiments of the United States Army
Military units and formations established in 1855